11th Madras Native Infantry may refer to:
 
1st Battalion, 11th Madras Native Infantry which became the 81st Pioneers
2nd Battalion, 11th Madras Native Infantry which became the  82nd Punjabis